Selma Rıza  (5 February 1872 – 5 October 1931) was the first female Turkish journalist. She was also one of the early novelists of Turkey. During the Turkish War of Liberation she supported Mustafa Kemal Pasha. After her death, her relatives assumed the surname Feraceli; so sometimes she is also known as Selma Rıza Feraceli.

Biography 

She was born on 5 February 1872. Her father was Ali Rıza, a diplomat of the Ottoman Empire at Austria-Hungary, and her mother Naile who was an Austrian convert.

After her education from private teachers in Istanbul, she traveled to Paris, France, in 1898 to meet her elder brother Ahmet Rıza, who was a member of the Young Turks movement. She studied in Sorbonne University, and was affiliated to the Committee of Union and Progress (CUP). She was the only female member of the committee. In Paris, she wrote in two newspapers published by CUP in Paris namely Mechveret Supplément Français in French and Şura'i Himmet in Turkish. In 1908, she returned to İstanbul, where she wrote in two newspapers; Hanımlara Mahsus Gazete ("Newspaper for Women") and Kadınlar Dünyası ("Women's World"). She also became the secretary general of Turkish Red Crescent between 1908–1913. During the last years of the Ottoman Empire, she worked hard to transform the Adile Sultan Palace, a royal palace in İstanbul, to a girls' school. With the help of her brother, she succeeded and the palace was used as Kandilli High School for Girls up to 1986, when it was partially burned down.

She died on 5 October 1931.

In 1892, while she was only twenty, she wrote an unpublished novel titled Uhuvvet ("Friendship"). It was published in 1999, long after her death, by the Ministry of Culture.

References

1872 births
University of Paris alumni
Young Turks
Turkish women journalists
Turkish women writers
1931 deaths